Barbara E. Ehrlich is Professor of Pharmacology and of Cellular and Molecular Physiology at Yale University working on the biophysics of membrane ion channels. Recent research investigates the function of polycystin-2, the inositol trisphosphate receptor, and the ryanodine receptor.

Early life and education
Ehrlich was born in New London, CT in 1952 and grew up in Newport, RI. Ehrlich attended Brown University, where she received a Bachelor of Science: ScB in Applied Mathematics and Biology. She then received her PhD from the University of California at Los Angeles in 1979 on the topic of membrane transport parameters in bipolar disorder.

Career 
At Brown University, Ehrlich worked with Helen Cserr, Professor of Physiology. Her doctoral advisor was Jared Diamond and she studied lithium transport in human red blood cells as a way to understand lithium treatment in bipolar disorder. Ehrlich completed her post doctoral research at the Albert Einstein College of Medicine and the Marine Biological Laboratory at Woods Hole. She then went on to work as a professor at the University of Connecticut for 11 years. At the University of Connecticut, she coined the term "Molecular Hermeneutics." Hermeneutics is a philosophical discipline derived from Hermes, who was the Messenger of the Gods and had to both deliver and interpret messages. Hermeneutics became the exegesis of the Bible, and eventually it evolved to interpretation, in particular of Truth and Beauty. She continues to be the Director of the Laboratory of Molecular Hermeneutics at Yale University, where she presently works.

Ehrlich began working at Yale University in 1997 as a professor of pharmacology and of cellular and molecular physiology. At Yale, Ehrlich has mainly focused on intracellular calcium regulation. Her laboratory uses calcium imaging combined with electrophysiological, biochemical, and molecular techniques to study the classes of calcium release channels known to exist inside virtually all cells: the inositol trisphosphate receptor-gated channel, the ryanodine receptor, and polycystin 2. Ehrlich and her team work to understand the loss of calcium regulation observed in disease states as seen in cells from patients with polycystic kidney disease or leading to drug-induced peripheral neuropathy. The Ehrlich team hypothesizes that these abnormalities in function are consequences, at least in part, of altered intracellular calcium homeostasis and that these studies will lead to suitable treatment regimens.

From 2004 to 2011, Ehrlich was on the board of scientific counselors at the Eunice Kennedy Shriver National Institute of Child Health and Human Development.

Awards 
 1979-1980       Bank of America – Giannini Foundation Fellowship
 1980-summer  Grass Foundation Fellowship in Neurophysiology
 1980-1982        Sidney Blackmer Postdoctoral Fellowship, Muscular Dystrophy Foundation
 1983-1986        Kurt P. Reiman Investigatorship, New York Heart Association 
 1983-1986        The American Home Products Grant-in-Aid, New York Heart Association 
 1986-summer   M.B.L. Summer Fellowship
 1986-1990         Pew Scholar in Biomedical science
 1987                  The Margaret Oakley Dayhoff Award in Biophysics
 1987-summer   M.B.L. Kuffler Fellowship
 1992, 1995        CAMEL Award for Best Pre-Clinical Course. Co-Organizer, Cardiovascular Subject Committee
 1995                  Blue Ribbon for Blueberry Pie, Barnstable County Fair, Falmouth, MA
 1996                  H.F. Cserr Memorial Lecture, Mount Desert Island Biological Laboratory
 2005                  K.S. Cole Award for Excellence in Membrane Biophysics, Biophysical Society

Elected offices 
 1989-1993        Trustee, Marine Biological Laboratory
 1988-1990         Councilor, Society of General Physiologists
 1993-1999        Science Council, Marine Biological Laboratory
 1995-1996        President, Society of General Physiologists
 1995-1998        Councillor, Biophysical Society
 2002-2008        Trustee, Children's School of Science, Woods Hole, Massachusetts
 2004-2010        Science Council, Marine Biological Laboratory
 2012-2016       Biological Science Advisory Committee, Yale University
 2012-2016       Tenure Appointments Committee for the Biological Sciences, Yale University
 2013–present    Wine steward, Berkeley College (Yale University)

Personal life 
Ehrlich was married to Lawrence B. Cohen, Professor of Cellular and Molecular Physiology at Yale University. Ehrlich has one daughter, and is presently married to Stuart M. Johnson. Ehrlich splits her time between New York City and New Haven, Connecticut.

References

External links
University page

https://jgp-soundsphys.rupress.org/2015/01/26/barbara-ehrlich/
https://medicine.yale.edu/lab/ehrlich/
Scientific American: "Talking Science with Mom"
Pembroke Center Oral History Project: Brown Women Speak: Barbara Ehrlich, class of 1974

Living people
Place of birth missing (living people)
American women biologists
Brown University alumni
University of California, Los Angeles alumni
Yale University faculty
1952 births
American women academics
21st-century American women